William John Lloyd (December 16, 1915 – December 24, 1972) was an American professional basketball player. He played for the Akron Goodyear Wingfoots in the National Basketball League and averaged 2.6 points per game. He later worked for Goodyear as an accountant.

Lloyd played college basketball for St. John's following his prep career at Richmond Hill High School in Queens.

References

1915 births
1972 deaths
Akron Goodyear Wingfoots players
American men's basketball players
Basketball players from New York City
Forwards (basketball)
Guards (basketball)
Sportspeople from Brooklyn
St. John's Red Storm men's basketball players